Stephanocircus domrowi, the goblin flea, is a critically endangered insect endemic to the Australian state of Victoria. It is host specific, and lives only with the co-endangered Leadbeater's possum. Although it has been suggested as a good candidate species for conservation, there is presently no work directed towards its conservation. The key threat factor driving the decline of the Leadbeater's possum, and by extension the co-endangered goblin flea, is logging in the mountain ash forests of the Victorian central highlands. To avoid extinction, a number of conservation steps will need to be taken including amalgamating the goblin flea into the captive breeding program for its host at Healesville Sanctuary.

See also
 Conservation-induced extinction

References

Fleas
Endemic fauna of Australia
Parasitic arthropods of mammals
Insects of Australia
Critically endangered insects
Critically endangered fauna of Australia